, also known by his Chinese style name , was a bureaucrat of the Ryukyu Kingdom.

Inoha Seihei was the eldest son of Inoha Seiki. He was also the second head of an aristocrat family called Mō-uji Inoha Dunchi.

Seihei served as a member of Sanshikan from 1694 to 1699.

References

Ueekata
Sanshikan
People of the Ryukyu Kingdom
Ryukyuan people
17th-century Ryukyuan people
1648 births
1700 deaths